Lallemant is a French surname that may originate in the phrase "l’Allemand", meaning "the German."  Variants of the name include: Laleman, Lalemand, Lalemant, Lalleman, L'allemand, and Lallemand.
It may refer to:

Persons
Charles Lallemant (1587–1674), first superior of the Jesuit missions in Canada 
Louis Lallemant (1588–1635), French Jesuit
Jérôme Lalemant (1593–1673), Jesuit priest who came to Canada in 1638
Gabriel Lallemant (1610–1649), Jesuit missionary, one of the eight Canadian Martyrs, a patron saint of Canada
Jacques-Philippe Lallemant (1660–1748), French Jesuit
François Antoine "Charles" Lallemand (1774–1839), French general who served under Napoleon
Raymond Lallemant (1919-2008), Belgian fighter pilot
J. Lallemant (1982-), Colombian writer, archivist and poet
Roza Lallemand (1961–2008), French chess player
Saúl Lallemand,(1977-), Colombian accordion player

See also
 Philippe Lallemand (1636–1716), French portrait painter
 Fritz L’Allemand (1812-1866), Austrian historical painter, whose most well known picture may be "Court banquet in the gardens of Schőnbrunn Palace on the centenary of the Militär-Maria-Theresia-Ordens" (1857). 
 Theo Lalleman (1946-2013), Dutch artist and writer

Places
Lalemant, Quebec, Canada
Saint-Gabriel-Lalemant, Quebec, Canada

References